Bandeppa Manikappa Kashempur (born 15 June 1964) is an Indian politician who served as the Co-operation minister in the Second Kumaraswamy ministry (8 June 2018 – 23 July 2019). He is the current Member of the Karnataka Legislative Assembly from the Bidar South constituency. He also served as Minister for Agriculture from 3 February 2006 to 9 October 2007 in First Kumaraswamy ministry (JDS-BJP Coalition government headed by H. D. Kumaraswamy). He is a member of Janata Dal (Secular) Party and hails from Kuruba community.

Positions held
 Agriculture Minister of Karnataka (3 February 2006 – 9 October 2007)
 Member of Legislative Assembly for Bidar (2004-2007)
Member of Legislative Assembly for Bidar South (2008-2013, 2018-Present)
 Co-operation Minister of Karnataka (8 June 2018 – 23 July 2019)

References

1964 births
Janata Dal (Secular) politicians
Living people
People from Bidar
State cabinet ministers of Karnataka
Karnataka MLAs 2004–2007
Karnataka MLAs 2008–2013
Karnataka MLAs 2018–2023